Walid Allati (born 1 August 1991) is an Algerian footballer who plays for MC El Bayadh in the Algerian Ligue Professionnelle 1.

Career
In 2019, he signed a two-year contract with MC Alger.
In 2021, he joined MC Oran.
In 2022, he joined MC El Bayadh.

References

External links

Living people
1991 births
Algerian footballers
US Biskra players
NA Hussein Dey players
MC Alger players
MC Oran players
Association football defenders
21st-century Algerian people